Nipper was the dog model for the painting His Late Master's Voice.

Nipper or Nippers may also refer to:
Nipper (Canadian comics), a comic strip by Doug Wright between 1949 and 1967
 Nipper (comics), a British comic book
 Chela (organ), a grasping structure on the limb of a crustacean or other arthropods
 Nipper (tool), a tool used to remove small amounts of a hard material
 Nippers, young surf lifesavers
 Tipsy Nipper, a light aircraft
 Jim "Nipper" Bradford (1926–2005), Australian rules footballer
 William "Nipper" Truscott (1886–1966), Australian rules footballer
 Nipper's Harbour, a community in Newfoundland & Labrador, Canada
 Nipper Building, an apartment block in New Jersey, USA

People with the surname Nipper:

 Al Nipper (born 1959), Major League Baseball coach
 Zack Nipper, American artist

See also
 NIP (disambiguation)
 Nippur, an ancient Sumerian city